Guru Ravidass Jayanti" is the birthday of Guru Ravidas,  celebrated on Magh Purnima, the full moon day in the month of Magh month. It is the annual focal point for the festival in India; People across countries celebrate this special occasion in India. Also, devotees take a holy dip in the river to perform rites. The 2020 date for the Jayanti was February 9, and the 2021 date was February 16.

He is known as a spiritual man and also as a social reformer because of his work against casteism. He was contemporary to saint Kabir.

Birth 

Ravidas Ji was born in the village Seer Goverdhanpur. He was contemporary to Kabir Ji, and has a number of recorded interactions with Kabir Ji on spirituality.

Celebration 

Guru Ravidas' birth is celebrated as Ravidas Jayanti. Guru Ravidas is revered due to his spirituality and works against casteism. He was a spiritual man. On this day, his followers bathe in the holy rivers. Then, they take inspiration from their Guru Ravidas Ji by remembering the great events and miracles related to his life. His devotees go to his place of birth and celebrate his birthday on Ravidas Jayanti.

Significance 

Ravidas Jayanti marks the birth of Ravidas Ji. Ravidas Ji is well-known for making efforts in eradicating caste system. He has also contributed to the Bhakti movement, and is well-recognized as a good friend and disciple of Kabir Ji.  Mirabai was his disciple.

Ravidas Jayanti has a special significance among the people following Ravidassia religion, that follows Ravidas Ji only, and other people who in any way revere Ravidas Ji like some of the Kabirpanthis, Sikhs, and other gurus.

Gallery

See also 

 Ravidas
 Kabir Jayanti
 Lahartara Pond

References

January observances
February observances
Ravidassia
Religious festivals in India
Hindu holy days
Hindu festivals in India